This article lists diplomatic missions resident in Estonia. At present, the capital city of Tallinn hosts 34 embassies. Several other countries have ambassadors accredited to Estonia, with most being resident in Nordic capitals.

Embassies in Tallinn

Consulates in Estonia

Non-resident embassies 
Helsinki:

Stockholm:

Berlin:

Warsaw:

Others:

 (Andorra la Vella)
 (Warsaw)
 (Paris)
 (Copenhagen)
 (Moscow)
 (Brussels)
 (Moscow)
 (Vilnius)
 (Brussels)
 (The Hague)
 (Minsk)
 (Prague)
 (Valletta)
 (Copenhagen)
 (Kyiv)
 (London)
 (Moscow)
 (San Marino)
 (Riga)
 (Minsk)
 (Minsk)
 (Riga)
 (Oslo)

Former embassies 
 (closed in 2011)

See also
Foreign relations of Estonia
List of diplomatic missions of Estonia
Visa requirements for Estonian citizens

Notes

References
Tallinn Diplomatic List

Estonia
Diplomatic missions